Barrick may refer to:

Barrick Gold, a Canadian mining company
Barrick Gaming Corporation, a Las Vegas-based gambling company
Barrick Nealy (born 1983), football quarterback in the CFL
David Barrick (born 1984), English cricketer
Dean Barrick (born 1969), English footballer
Des Barrick (1926–2007), English cricketer
Jesse T. Barrick (1841–1923)[2], American soldier and Medal of Honor recipient
Murray Barrick, professor of business

See also
 Barack (disambiguation)